The Central Autónoma de Trabajadores del Perú (CATP) is a national trade union center in Peru. It is affiliated with the International Trade Union Confederation.

References

External links

Trade unions in Peru
International Trade Union Confederation